The Safed Baradari  (literally 'white palace'), is a white marbled building in Lucknow Uttar Pradesh, India.

History
It was built by Nawab Wajid Ali Shah as a 'palace of mourning' and was named Qasr-ul-Aza. Initial purpose of this building was to be used as an Imambara for observing 'azadaari' (mourning) for the martyrdom of Imam Hussain and his followers at Karbala.

After the annexation of Awadh in 1856, the Baradari was used by the British to hold court for petitions and claims by the officers and nobles of the deposed King's reign and his relatives. Later (around 1923) it was handed over, as a gesture of appreciation for their submission and loyalty to the Queen of the British Empire, to the Taluqadars of Awadh for their 'Anjuman' (association) which was renamed as the British India Association of Oudh. The Baradari continues to be in their possession and control.

Interior
The main hall of the Baradari has two marble statues of the Maharajas, Man Singh and Digvijay Singh of Balrampur, the founders of the association. The statue of Sir Man Singh was carved by Farmer & Brindley of London, at a cost of £2 000, and was unveiled on 13 August 1902 by Sir James John Digges La Touche, Lieutenant-Governor of the United Provinces of Agra and Oudh.

References

Buildings and structures in Lucknow
Marble buildings
1854 establishments in India
Buildings and structures completed in 1854